The following television stations broadcast on digital channel 23 in the United States:

 K23AA-D in Beatrice, Nebraska
 K23BJ-D in Lake Havasu City, Arizona
 K23BV-D in Montpelier, Idaho
 K23CU-D in Prineville, Oregon
 K23DB-D in La Grande, Oregon
 K23DE-D in Childress, Texas
 K23DJ-D in Ekalaka, Montana
 K23DK-D in Meadview, Arizona
 K23DO-D in Malta, Idaho
 K23DS-D in Evanston, Wyoming
 K23DT-D in Tahoe City, California
 K23DV-D in Beryl/Modena/New, Utah
 K23DX-D in Pitkin, Colorado, on virtual channel 8, which rebroadcasts KTSC
 K23EX-D in Medford, Oregon
 K23FC-D in Elko, Nevada
 K23FE-D in Gallup, New Mexico
 K23FH-D in Milton-Freewater, Oregon
 K23FO-D in Jackson, Minnesota
 K23FP-D in Olivia, Minnesota, on virtual channel 11, which rebroadcasts KARE
 K23FR-D in Winnemucca, Nevada
 K23FT-D in Myton, Utah
 K23FV-D in Kingman, Arizona
 K23FY-D in Frost, Minnesota
 K23FZ-D in Camp Verde, Arizona
 K23GF-D in Dove Creek, etc., Colorado, on virtual channel 23
 K23GK-D in Astoria, Oregon, on virtual channel 10, which rebroadcasts KOPB-TV
 K23GR-D in Preston, Idaho, on virtual channel 5, which rebroadcasts KSL-TV
 K23HT-D in St. Maries, Idaho
 K23IC-D in Huntsville, etc., Utah, on virtual channel 5, which rebroadcasts KSL-TV
 K23IS-D in Ridgecrest, etc., California, on virtual channel 56, which rebroadcasts KDOC-TV
 K23IV-D in Spring Glen, Utah
 K23IX-D in Clark, etc., Wyoming
 K23IZ-D in Strong City, Oklahoma
 K23JC-D in Montezuma Creek/Aneth, Utah
 K23JD-D in Colfax, New Mexico
 K23JH-D in Leadore, Idaho
 K23JK-D in Tillamook, Oregon
 K23JN-D in Virgin, Utah
 K23JU-D in Prosser, Washington
 K23JV-D in Green River, Utah
 K23JX-D in Hatch, Utah
 K23JY-D in Huntington, Utah
 K23KC-D in Bluff, etc., Utah
 K23KD-D in Coos Bay, etc., Oregon
 K23KL-D in Farmington, New Mexico
 K23KN-D in Las Animas, Colorado
 K23KO-D in Rural Beaver County, Utah
 K23KP-D in Fishlake Resort, Utah
 K23KY-D in Council, Idaho
 K23KZ-D in Bigfork/Marcell, Minnesota
 K23LB-D in Fargo, North Dakota
 K23LE-D in Sedalia, Missouri
 K23LF-D in Eureka, Nevada
 K23LH-D in Cortez, Colorado
 K23LW-D in Emigrant, Montana
 K23LX-D in Conrad, Montana
 K23ME-D in Camas Valley, Oregon
 K23MF-D in St. James, Minnesota
 K23ML-D in Newberry Springs, California, on virtual channel 23
 K23MQ-D in Duluth, Minnesota
 K23MT-D in Mexican Hat, Utah
 K23MU-D in Bridgeport, Washington
 K23MV-D in Carlsbad, New Mexico
 K23NB-D in York, Nebraska
 K23ND-D in Sayre, Oklahoma
 K23NF-D in Romeo, etc., Colorado
 K23NH-D in Seiling, Oklahoma
 K23NI-D in Crescent City, California
 K23NJ-D in Prescott, etc., Arizona, on virtual channel 8, which rebroadcasts KAET
 K23NL-D in Cottonwood/Grangeville, Idaho
 K23NM-D in Sandpoint, Idaho
 K23NN-D in Las Vegas, New Mexico
 K23NP-D in Thompson Falls, Montana
 K23NQ-D in Lewiston, Idaho
 K23NR-D in Mount Pleasant, Utah, on virtual channel 13, which rebroadcasts KSTU
 K23NS-D in Rockaway Beach, Oregon
 K23NT-D in Mayfield, Utah
 K23NU-D in Richfield, etc., Utah, on virtual channel 16, which rebroadcasts KUPX-TV
 K23NV-D in Summit County, Utah
 K23NW-D in Montrose, Colorado
 K23NX-D in Gateway, Colorado
 K23NY-D in St. George, Utah, on virtual channel 4, which rebroadcasts KTVX
 K23OA-D in Kanarraville, Utah
 K23OD-D in Scipio, Utah
 K23OE-D in Kasilof, Alaska
 K23OH-D in Orangeville, Utah, on virtual channel 16, which rebroadcasts KUPX-TV
 K23OI-D in Tucumcari, New Mexico
 K23OK-D in Walker Lake, Nevada
 K23OM-D in Victorville, California, on virtual channel 47, which rebroadcasts KCET
 K23ON-D in Lund & Preston, Nevada
 K23OO-D in Moon Ranch, New Mexico
 K23OR-D in Pagosa Springs, Colorado
 K23OS-D in London Springs, Oregon
 K23OT-D in Juliaetta, Idaho
 K23OU-D in Pueblo, Colorado
 K23OV-D in Hood River, Oregon, on virtual channel 6, which rebroadcasts KOIN
 K23OW-D in Hot Springs, Arkansas
 K23OX-D in Holyoke, Colorado
 K23PA-D in Klamath Falls, Oregon
 K23PL-D in Shonto, Arizona, on virtual channel 38
 K23PN-D in La Pine, Oregon
 K23PU-D in Norfolk, Nebraska
 K38CZ-D in Lincoln City/Newport, Oregon, on virtual channel 6, which rebroadcasts KOIN
 K40LH-D in Orderville, Utah
 K50KK-D in Ellensburg, Washington
 KAGS-LD in Bryan, Texas
 KCDN-LD in Kansas City, Missouri, on virtual channel 43
 KCDO-TV in Sterling, Colorado, on virtual channel 3
 KCDO-TV (DRT) in Kimball, Nebraska, on virtual channel 3
 KCTU-LD in Wichita, Kansas
 KCWI-TV in Ames, Iowa
 KCWT-CD in La Feria, Texas
 KDGL-LD in Sublette, Kansas
 KEDT in Corpus Christi, Texas
 KEKE in Hilo, Hawaii
 KETC in St. Louis, Missouri, on virtual channel 9
 KEVN-LD in Rapid City, South Dakota
 KEVU-CD in Eugene, Oregon
 KEZI in Elkton, Oregon
 KFUL-LD in San Luis Obispo, California
 KGMB in Honolulu, Hawaii
 KGSA-LD in San Antonio, Texas
 KGWZ-LD in Portland, Oregon, on virtual channel 8, which rebroadcasts KGW
 KIMG-LD in Ventura, California, on virtual channel 31, which rebroadcasts KVMD
 KIRO-TV in Seattle, Washington, on virtual channel 7
 KKIF-LD in Twin Falls, Idaho
 KLCW-TV in Wolfforth, Texas
 KLPB-TV in Lafayette, Louisiana
 KLTJ in Galveston, Texas, on virtual channel 22
 KLVD-LD in Las Vegas, Nevada
 KMUV-LD in Monterey, California
 KNCD-LD in Nacogdoches, Texas
 KNVA in Austin, Texas
 KODE-TV in Joplin, Missouri
 KONV-LD in Canton, Ohio, on virtual channel 28
 KPDD-LD in Evergreen, Colorado
 KPEJ-TV in Odessa, Texas
 KPVI-DT in Pocatello, Idaho
 KQCA in Stockton, California, an ATSC 3.0 station, on virtual channel 58
 KQDA-LD in Denison, Texas
 KQEG-CA in La Crescent, Minnesota
 KRDT-CD in Redding, California
 KREG-TV in Glenwood Springs, Colorado
 KRWG-TV in Las Cruces, New Mexico
 KRXI-TV in Reno, Nevada
 KSBI in Oklahoma City, Oklahoma
 KSCZ-LD in San Jose-San Francisco, California, on virtual channel 16
 KSL-TV in Salt Lake City, Utah, on virtual channel 5
 KSLA in Shreveport, Louisiana
 KSMV-LD in Los Angeles, California, on virtual channel 31, which rebroadcasts KVMD
 KSNL-LD in Salina, Kansas
 KSXF-LD in Sioux Falls, South Dakota
 KTCI-TV in St. Paul, Minnesota, on virtual channel 2
 KTFF-DT in Porterville, California
 KTMF in Missoula, Montana
 KTPE-LD in Kansas City, Missouri
 KTUO-LD in Tulsa, Oklahoma
 KTVP-LD in Phoenix, Arizona, on virtual channel 23
 KTVS-LD in Albuquerque, New Mexico
 KTXD-TV in Greenville, Texas, on virtual channel 47
 KVCV-LD in Victoria, Texas
 KVMD in Twentynine Palms, California, on virtual channel 31
 KVOA in Tucson, Arizona
 W23BV-D in Evansville, Indiana
 W23BW-D in Madison, Wisconsin
 W23DM-D in Falmouth, Kentucky, on virtual channel 52, which rebroadcasts WKON
 W23DR-D in Romney, West Virginia, to move to channel 21, on virtual channel 24, which rebroadcasts WNPB-TV
 W23EB-D in Cadillac, Michigan
 W23EQ-D in Danville, Illinois
 W23ER-D in Poughkeepsie, New York, on virtual channel 17, which rebroadcasts WMHT
 W23ES-D in Marshall, North Carolina
 W23EU-D in Rutland, Vermont
 W23EV-D in Carrollton, Georgia, on virtual channel 28, which rebroadcasts WJSP-TV
 W23EW-D in Springfield, Illinois
 W23EX-D in Sussex, New Jersey, on virtual channel 58, which rebroadcasts WNJB
 W23EY-D in Canton, North Carolina
 W23EZ-D in Sylva, North Carolina
 W23FC-D in Eau Claire, Wisconsin
 W23FH-D in Erie, Pennsylvania
 W23FI-D in Valdosta, Georgia
 W23FJ-D in Jennings, Florida
 W23FL-D in Traverse City, Michigan
 W23FN-D in Albany, Georgia
 WAAU-LD in Augusta, Georgia
 WAPW-CD in Abingdon, etc., Virginia
 WAUA-LD in Columbus, Georgia
 WNGT-CD in Smithfield-Selma, North Carolina, an ATSC 3.0 station, on virtual channel 34
 WBAY-TV in Green Bay, Wisconsin
 WBSF in Bay City, Michigan
 WBTV in Charlotte, North Carolina, on virtual channel 3
 WBXZ-LD in Buffalo, New York
 WCIU-TV in Chicago, Illinois, on virtual channel 26
 WCUH-LD in Fort Wayne, Indiana
 WCVI-TV in Christiansted, U.S. Virgin Islands
 WDDN-LD in Washington, D.C., on virtual channel 23
 WDMR-LD in Springfield, Massachusetts
 WDPM-DT in Mobile, Alabama
 WDTI in Indianapolis, Indiana, on virtual channel 69
 WDVM-TV in Hagerstown, Maryland, on virtual channel 25
 WDWA-LD in Dale City, Virginia, to move to channel 29, on virtual channel 23
 WECT in Wilmington, North Carolina
 WETM-TV in Elmira, New York
 WFBN-LD in Rockford, Illinois
 WFLI-TV in Cleveland, Tennessee
 WFTY-DT in Smithtown, New York, on virtual channel 67
 WHPM-LD in Hattiesburg, Mississippi
 WHSU-CD in Syracuse, New York
 WITD-CD in Chesapeake, Virginia
 WJDE-CD in Nashville, Tennessee, on virtual channel 31
 WJDG-LD in Grundy, Virginia
 WKCF in Clermont, Florida, on virtual channel 18
 WKPD in Paducah, Kentucky
 WKPI-TV in Pikeville, Kentucky
 WKTB-CD in Norcross, Georgia, on virtual channel 47
 WKZT-TV in Elizabethtown, Kentucky
 WLAE-TV in New Orleans, Louisiana
 WLED-TV in Littleton, New Hampshire
 WLTV-DT in Miami, Florida, on virtual channel 23
 WMDV-LD in Danville, Virginia
 WMJF-CD in Towson, Maryland, on virtual channel 39
 WNJS in Camden, New Jersey, on virtual channel 23
 WNJT in Trenton, New Jersey, uses WNJS' spectrum, on virtual channel 52
 WNPI-DT in Norwood, New York
 WNWO-TV in Toledo, Ohio
 WOIL-CD in Talladega, Alabama
 WPGA-TV in Perry, Georgia
 WPXI in Pittsburgh, Pennsylvania, on virtual channel 11
 WPXG-TV in Concord, New Hampshire, on virtual channel 21
 WQAP-LD in Montgomery, Alabama
 WQPT-TV in Moline, Illinois
 WQSJ-CD in Quebradillas, Puerto Rico, on virtual channel 48, which rebroadcasts WSJN-CD
 WRGX-LD in Dothan, Alabama
 WSVT-LD in Tampa, Florida, on virtual channel 18
 WTAS-LD in Waukesha, Wisconsin, on virtual channel 47
 WTVR-TV in Richmond, Virginia
 WTWV in Memphis, Tennessee
 WUNC-TV (DRT) in Oxford, North Carolina, on virtual channel 4
 WUSI-TV in Olney, Illinois
 WVSN in Humacao, Puerto Rico, on virtual channel 68
 WVUA-CD in Tuscaloosa/Northport, Alabama
 WWHO in Chillicothe, Ohio, an ATSC 3.0 station, on virtual channel 53
 WWJX in Jackson, Mississippi
 WWTW in Senatobia, Mississippi, uses WTWV's spectrum.
 WXNY-LD in New York, New York, on virtual channel 32
 WYDN in Lowell, Massachusetts, uses WPXG-TV's spectrum, on virtual channel 48
 WZPJ-LD in Bennington, Vermont
 WZVC-LD in Athens, Georgia

The following stations, which are no longer licensed, formerly broadcast on digital channel 23:
 K23EC-D in Canadian, Texas
 K23KV-D in Austin, Nevada
 K23LK-D in Modesto, California
 K23NZ-D in Three Forks, Montana
 KHMM-CD in Hanford, California
 WIEK-LD in Midland, Michigan
 WLDW-LD in Myrtle Beach, South Carolina
 WODX-LD in Springfield, Illinois
 WQDU-LD in Albany, Georgia
 WTSD-CD in Philadelphia, Pennsylvania
 WUEA-LD in Lafayette, Indiana
 WUOF-LD in Gainesville, Florida

References

23 digital